Maasina is a village on the island of Upolu in Samoa. It is situated on the north east coast of the island in the political district of Va'a-o-Fonoti. 

The population is 129.

References

Populated places in Va'a-o-Fonoti